Elsterwerda-Biehla station is a railway station in the Biehla district of the town of Elsterwerda, located in the Elbe-Elster district in Brandenburg, Germany.

References

Railway stations in Brandenburg
Buildings and structures in Elbe-Elster
Railway stations in Germany opened in 1874
1874 establishments in Prussia